Mina quasi Jannacci is an album by Italian singer Mina, released in October 1977.

The album contains ten songs originally written by Enzo Jannacci, who duets with Mina on this album. All ten songs were reinterpreted and special arrangements for the orchestra was written by Gianni Ferrio. The album was originally sold as a double LP along with Mina con bignè. The first edition of the two LPs were sold with their respective covers in a canvas bag bearing Mina's autograph.

The song Vita vita was used the same year for the soundtrack of the film Great Boiled, by Mauro Bolognini.

Track listing

1977 albums
Mina (Italian singer) albums
Italian-language compilation albums